Orka is a fictional character appearing in American comic books published by Marvel Comics. The character was created by Roy Thomas and Marie Severin, and has a killer whale theme. Orka primarily appears as a villain fighting the Avengers, the Fantastic Four, She-Hulk, and the Defenders, and also appears as a member of Heroes for Hire.

Publication history

Orka first appears in Prince Namor, the Sub-Mariner #23 (March 1970) and was created by Roy Thomas and Marie Severin.

Fictional character biography
Orka was originally an Atlantean soldier in the army of Warlord Krang, and aids the renegade Krang when he attempts to usurp the Atlantean throne from Namor. When this attempt fails, Orka goes into exile from Atlantis with Krang. Orka is then chosen to be the test subject of Dr. Dorcas, the marine scientist who created Tiger Shark, one of Namor's arch foes. Courtesy of a belt with a psionic amplifier, Orka is given the power of a killer whale, and aids Krang once more against Namor. The character skirmishes with fellow creation Tiger Shark, and the pair cause an undersea avalanche that buries them for several months. 

Orka eventually freed himself and allies with the other-dimensional Virago, and after battling Namor twice is defeated. Orka is sent on a mission that brings him into conflict with superhero team the Avengers, with Thunder God Thor knocking him unconscious.

When the Atlantean barbarian Attuma takes over the city of Atlantis, Orka is pardoned from his exile and joins the Imperial Army. Part of an invasion force that attacks the surface world, Orka battles the Avengers and the Fantastic Four, but is defeated by heroine She-Hulk and the Black Panther and imprisoned.

Orka escapes imprisonment and joins marine team Deep Six (also consisting of Attuma, Nagala, Piranha, Sea Urchin and Tiger Shark). The group attack the United States and battles the Avengers and the People's Protectorate and are eventually defeated.

Orka features in several other Marvel titles such as Fantastic Four She-Hulk and the Defenders. After the events of the Civil War, Orka features in the title Heroes for Hire and joins the team (also falling in love with fellow member Misty Knight). He also strikes up a friendship with the Heroes for Hire's invulnerable administrative assistant. Orka is killed in combat by a Doombot (a robotic copy of villain Doctor Doom) reprogrammed by the Headmen.

During the "Dark Reign" storyline, Orka was seen in Erebus gambling for his resurrection. He is later seen on Pluto's jury (alongside Abomination, Armless Tiger Man, Artume, Baron Heinrich Zemo, Commander Kraken, Iron Monger, Jack O'Lantern, Kyknos, Nessus, Scourge of the Underworld, and Veranke) at the trial of Zeus.

Orka turns up alive and is imprisoned in the Cellar by soldiers working for Regent's company Empire Unlimited.

Orka appears as a member of Namor's Defenders of the Deep. Orka was shown being attacked by Hyperion of the Squadron Supreme of America.

Powers and abilities
Orka is an exceptionally strong Atlantean, who courtesy of Doctor Dorcas' enhancements Orka has superhuman strength, speed, stamina, durability, and agility. Orka originally wore a belt which by psionic means provided the added power of a killer whale to the character's already considerable strength. The belt also allowed Orka to exist for indefinite periods on land although he was not at full strength due to dehydration. Using surgical and electrochemical enhancements, the Brand Corporation augmented Orka's natural abilities, which allowed him to retain his strength without the use of the belt. The experimentation also increased Orka's size, resilience and endurance, but at the cost of reduced intelligence. Orka can communicate with and summon killer whales through high-pitched whistles; so long as there are killer whales in his vicinity Orka's physical abilities increase several time over. He can also swim at superhuman speeds.

In other media
Orka appears in the Avengers Assemble episode "Kingbreaker" Pt. 1, voiced by Roger Craig Smith. This version is a commander who is loyal to Attuma and replaces Tiger Shark as the head of Attuma's armed forces. When Black Panther, White Wolf, and Attuma's daughter Lady Elanna bring their fight with Killmonger, Tiger Shark, and the Atlantean soldiers on their side to Atlantis' Coral Guard, Orka and his soldiers show up. When he learns of the coup and Tiger Shark claims that Attuma has gotten soft, Orka sides with Elanna and his soldiers lock up Killmonger, Tiger Shark, and the traitorous Atlantean soldiers. Then he apologizes to Elanna for hesitating. Orka later assists in rescuing the Atlantean civilians from the damages caused by Princess Zanda's bombs and was present when Killmonger kills Attuma. As Black Panther and White Wolf go after Killmonger, Orka gives Lady Elanna her father's trident and swears her in as the new ruler of Atlantis. Orka later led the Atlantean soldiers into attacking Black Panther and White Wolf as they were taking Killmonger as their prisoner due to him knowing where the real Black Widow is.

References

External links
 
 
 The Grand Comics Database entry for the comic containing Orka's debut

Characters created by Marie Severin
Characters created by Roy Thomas
Comics characters introduced in 1970
Fictional characters with superhuman durability or invulnerability
Marvel Comics Atlanteans (Homo mermanus)
Marvel Comics characters who can move at superhuman speeds
Marvel Comics characters with superhuman strength
Marvel Comics supervillains